Ofisa Francis Junior Tonu'u (born 3 February 1970) is a New Zealand former rugby union player and Samoa cricketer. Of Samoan parentage, Tonu'u played 14 matches including five tests for Samoa in 1992 and 1993. He was later a member of the New Zealand national side, the All Blacks, from 1996 to 1998. He played eight matches for the All Blacks including five internationals.

Cricket
In 2013, he was a member of the Auckland Cricket Society Premier Men's Cricket team. He still plays for Auckland Cricket Society in annual fixtures.

In July 2019, at the age of 49, he represented the Samoa national cricket team in the men's tournament at the 2019 Pacific Games. He made his Twenty20 International (T20I) debut against Papua New Guinea on 8 July 2019.

References

1970 births
Living people
Rugby union players from Wellington City
New Zealand sportspeople of Samoan descent
People educated at Rongotai College
New Zealand rugby union players
New Zealand international rugby union players
Wellington rugby union players
Auckland rugby union players
Blues (Super Rugby) players
Hurricanes (rugby union) players
London Irish players
Newport RFC players
New Zealand expatriate sportspeople in England
New Zealand expatriate sportspeople in Wales
Expatriate rugby union players in England
Expatriate rugby union players in Wales
Rugby union scrum-halves
Samoa international rugby sevens players
Samoan cricketers
Samoa Twenty20 International cricketers